The Rivulinae are a subfamily of moths in the family Erebidae described by Augustus Radcliffe Grote in 1895. Caterpillars in the subfamily typically have long, barbed hairs and have full prolegs on abdominal segments 3 through 6. The adults have a unique microsculpturing proboscis.

Taxonomy
This subfamily was previously classified as part of the subfamily Hypeninae of Erebidae or within Noctuidae. Recent phylogenetic studies did not discover a close relationship with the Hypeninae but keep it within the Erebidae.

Genera
Alesua
Bocula
Oxycilla
Oglasa
Rivula
Zebeeba
Zelicodes

References

 
Moth subfamilies